Li Ning (born July 1958) is a Chinese engineer specializing in hydrocarbon exploration. He is an academician of the Chinese Academy of Engineering (CAE) and serves as deputy director of the Institute of Well-Logging and Remote Sensing, Research Institute of Petroleum Exploration and Development (RIPED).

Biography
Li was born in Huan County, Gansu in July 1958. He secondary studied at Huan County No.1 High School. After the resumption of National College Entrance Examination, he enrolled at Huadong Petroleum Institute (now China University of Petroleum). From January 1989 to January 1991 he was a postdoctoral fellow at the Institute of Geology and Geophysics, Chinese Academy of Sciences (IGGCAS). After graduation, he joined the Research Institute of Petroleum Exploration and Development (RIPED). In 2017, he became a visiting professor at the China University of Petroleum. On December 6, 2019, he was haired as a distinguished professor at Anhui University of Science and Technology.

Honours and awards
 1992 China Youth Science and Technology Award
 November 22, 2019 Member of the Chinese Academy of Engineering (CAE)

References

External links
Li Ning on the Institute of Geology and Geophysics, Chinese Academy of Sciences (IGGCAS)  

1958 births
Living people
People from Huan County
Engineers from Gansu
China University of Petroleum alumni
Academic staff of Anhui University of Science and Technology
Members of the Chinese Academy of Engineering